The 1980–81 UEFA Cup was won by Ipswich Town on aggregate over AZ Alkmaar.

According to a UEFA decision in 1979, Fairs Cup entry criteria were finally abolished, and UEFA ranking was introduced.

Albania did not join, and it ceded its place to the West German title holders.

First round

|}

First leg

Second leg

Zbrojovka Brno won 5–1 on aggregate.

3–3 on aggregate; Kaiserslautern won on away goals.

Magdeburg won 5–3 on aggregate.

AZ Alkmaar won 10–0 on aggregate.

Vorwärts Frankfurt won 4–2 on aggregate.

Dynamo Dresden won 2–0 on aggregate.

Utrecht won 2–0 on aggregate.

FC Bohemians Praha won 4–3 on aggregate.

1–1 on aggregate; Levski Sofia won on away goals.

Eintracht Frankfurt won 3–1 on aggregate.

Sochaux won 3–2 on aggregate.

Twente won 5–3 on aggregate.

Beroe Stara Zagora won 3–1 on aggregate.

Porto won 1–0 on aggregate.

Grasshopper won 8–3 on aggregate.

Hamburg won 7–5 on aggregate.

St Mirren won 2–1 on aggregate.

Ipswich Town won 6–4 on aggregate.

Köln won 10–0 on aggregate.

Juventus won 6–4 on aggregate.

Lokeren won 2–1 on aggregate.

Saint-Étienne won 14–0 on aggregate.

Radnički Niš won 6–2 on aggregate.

1–1 on aggregate; Widzew Łódź won on away goals.

PSV Eindhoven won 3–2 on aggregate.

Torino won 4–3 on aggregate.

Dundee United won 7–2 on aggregate.

Barcelona won 3–0 on aggregate.

Standard Liège won 3–2 on aggregate.

Real Sociedad won 2–1 on aggregate.

Boavista won 2–1 on aggregate.

Stuttgart won 10–1 on aggregate.

Second round

|}

First leg

Second leg

Real Sociedad won 3–2 on aggregate.

Standard Liège won 4–2 on aggregate.

1. FC Köln won 4–1 on aggregate.

1–1 on aggregate; Lokeren won on away goals

Eintracht Frankfurt won 4–3 on aggregate.

Sochaux won 3–2 on aggregate.

1–1 on aggregate; Dynamo Dresden won on away goals

Grasshoppers won 3–2 on aggregate.

Ipswich Town won 3–2 on aggregate.

Radnički Niš won 3–1 on aggregate.

AZ Alkmaar won 6–1 on aggregate.

Hamburg won 3–2 on aggregate.

Saint-Étienne won 2–0 on aggregate.

Torino won 3–2 on aggregate.

Stuttgart won 7–2 on aggregate.

4–4 on aggregate; Widzew Łódź won 4–1 on penalties.

Third round

|}

First leg

Second leg

4–4 on aggregate; Sochaux won on away goals.

3–3 on aggregate; Grasshoppers won 4–3 on penalties.

Saint-Étienne won 6–0 on aggregate.

Ipswich Town won 5–1 on aggregate.

Lokeren won 3–2 on aggregate.

AZ won 7–2 on aggregate.

Standard Liège won 5–2 on aggregate.

Köln won 5–4 on aggregate.

Quarter-finals

|}

First leg

Second leg

Ipswich Town won 7–2 on aggregate.

AZ Alkmaar won 2–1 on aggregate.

Sochaux won 2–1 on aggregate.

Köln won 3–2 on aggregate.

Semi-finals

|}

First leg

Second leg

AZ Alkmaar won 4–3 on aggregate.

Ipswich Town won 2–0 on aggregate.

Final

First leg

Second leg

Ipswich Town won 5–4 on aggregate.

See also
 1980–81 European Cup
 1980–81 European Cup Winners' Cup

References

External links
1980–81 All matches UEFA Cup – season at UEFA website
Official website
Results at RSSSF.com
 All scorers 1980–81 UEFA Cup according to protocols UEFA
1980/81 UEFA Cup - results and line-ups (archive)

UEFA Cup seasons
2